Ademar Fonseca Nogueira Júnior (17 April 1963 – 8 June 2017), commonly known as Dema, was a Brazilian football manager.

Career
Fonseca was the head coach of the Brazil women's national team at the 1995 FIFA Women's World Cup.

References

External links
 
 
 Ademar Fonseca at Soccerdonna.de 

1963 births
2017 deaths
Brazilian football managers
Women's association football managers
Brazil women's national football team managers
1995 FIFA Women's World Cup managers
Venezuela women's national football team managers
Brazilian expatriate football managers
Brazilian expatriate sportspeople in Venezuela
Expatriate football managers in Venezuela